Church Road may refer to:

In the United Kingdom 
 Church Road (football stadium), a football stadium Hayes, England
 Church Road Ground, a cricket ground in Lytham, Lancashire
 Church Road Cricket Ground, a cricket ground in Earley, Berkshire
 Church Road railway station (disambiguation), various stations in England or Wales
 Church End, Brent, a locality in London, or the main thoroughfare of the neighbourhood

In the United States 
 Church Road, Virginia, an unincorporated community

See also
 

Odonyms referring to a building
Odonyms referring to religion